Modubavigudem is a village in Yadadri district in Telangana, India. It falls under Atmakur (M) mandal.

References

Villages in Yadadri Bhuvanagiri district